The arrondissement of Bergerac is an arrondissement of France in the Dordogne department in the Nouvelle-Aquitaine region. It has 130 communes.

Composition

The communes in the arrondissement of Bergerac, and their INSEE codes, are:

 Alles-sur-Dordogne (24005)
 Badefols-sur-Dordogne (24022)
 Baneuil (24023)
 Bardou (24024)
 Bayac (24027)
 Beaumontois-en-Périgord (24028)
 Bergerac (24037)
 Biron (24043)
 Boisse (24045)
 Bonneville-et-Saint-Avit-de-Fumadières (24048)
 Bosset (24051)
 Bouillac (24052)
 Bouniagues (24054)
 Bourniquel (24060)
 Le Buisson-de-Cadouin (24068)
 Calès (24073)
 Capdrot (24080)
 Carsac-de-Gurson (24083)
 Cause-de-Clérans (24088)
 Colombier (24126)
 Conne-de-Labarde (24132)
 Cours-de-Pile (24140)
 Couze-et-Saint-Front (24143)
 Creysse (24145)
 Cunèges (24148)
 Eymet (24167)
 Faurilles (24176)
 Faux (24177)
 Le Fleix (24182)
 Fonroque (24186)
 La Force (24222)
 Fougueyrolles (24189)
 Fraisse (24191)
 Gageac-et-Rouillac (24193)
 Gardonne (24194)
 Gaugeac (24195)
 Ginestet (24197)
 Issigeac (24212)
 Lalinde (24223)
 Lamonzie-Montastruc (24224)
 Lamonzie-Saint-Martin (24225)
 Lamothe-Montravel (24226)
 Lanquais (24228)
 Lavalade (24231)
 Lembras (24237)
 Liorac-sur-Louyre (24242)
 Lolme (24244)
 Lunas (24246)
 Marsalès (24257)
 Mauzac-et-Grand-Castang (24260)
 Mescoules (24267)
 Minzac (24272)
 Molières (24273)
 Monbazillac (24274)
 Monestier (24276)
 Monfaucon (24277)
 Monmadalès (24278)
 Monmarvès (24279)
 Monpazier (24280)
 Monsac (24281)
 Monsaguel (24282)
 Montaut (24287)
 Montazeau (24288)
 Montcaret (24289)
 Montferrand-du-Périgord (24290)
 Montpeyroux (24292)
 Mouleydier (24296)
 Nastringues (24306)
 Naussannes (24307)
 Pezuls (24327)
 Plaisance (24168)
 Pomport (24331)
 Pontours (24334)
 Port-Sainte-Foy-et-Ponchapt (24335)
 Pressignac-Vicq (24338)
 Prigonrieux (24340)
 Queyssac (24345)
 Rampieux (24347)
 Razac-d'Eymet (24348)
 Razac-de-Saussignac (24349)
 Ribagnac (24351)
 Rouffignac-de-Sigoulès (24357)
 Sadillac (24359)
 Saint-Agne (24361)
 Saint-Antoine-de-Breuilh (24370)
 Saint-Aubin-de-Cadelech (24373)
 Saint-Aubin-de-Lanquais (24374)
 Saint-Avit-Rivière (24378)
 Saint-Avit-Sénieur (24379)
 Saint-Capraise-de-Lalinde (24382)
 Saint-Capraise-d'Eymet (24383)
 Saint-Cassien (24384)
 Saint-Cernin-de-Labarde (24385)
 Sainte-Croix (24393)
 Sainte-Foy-de-Longas (24407)
 Sainte-Radegonde (24492)
 Saint-Félix-de-Villadeix (24405)
 Saint-Georges-Blancaneix (24413)
 Saint-Géraud-de-Corps (24415)
 Saint-Germain-et-Mons (24419)
 Saint-Géry (24420)
 Saint-Julien-Innocence-Eulalie (24423)
 Saint-Laurent-des-Vignes (24437)
 Saint-Léon-d'Issigeac (24441)
 Saint-Marcel-du-Périgord (24445)
 Saint-Marcory (24446)
 Saint-Martin-de-Gurson (24454)
 Saint-Méard-de-Gurçon (24461)
 Saint-Michel-de-Montaigne (24466)
 Saint-Nexans (24472)
 Saint-Perdoux (24483)
 Saint-Pierre-d'Eyraud (24487)
 Saint-Rémy (24494)
 Saint-Romain-de-Monpazier (24495)
 Saint-Sauveur (24499)
 Saint-Seurin-de-Prats (24501)
 Saint-Vivien (24514)
 Saussignac (24523)
 Serres-et-Montguyard (24532)
 Sigoulès-et-Flaugeac (24534)
 Singleyrac (24536)
 Soulaures (24542)
 Thénac (24549)
 Trémolat (24558)
 Urval (24560)
 Varennes (24566)
 Vélines (24568)
 Verdon (24570)
 Vergt-de-Biron (24572)
 Villefranche-de-Lonchat (24584)

History

The arrondissement of Bergerac was created in 1800. At the January 2017 reorganisation of the arrondissements of Dordogne, it lost 21 communes to the arrondissement of Périgueux and one commune to the arrondissement of Sarlat-la-Canéda.

As a result of the reorganisation of the cantons of France which came into effect in 2015, the borders of the cantons are no longer related to the borders of the arrondissements. The cantons of the arrondissement of Bergerac were, as of January 2015:

 Beaumont-du-Périgord
 Bergerac-1
 Bergerac-2
 Le Buisson-de-Cadouin
 Eymet
 La Force
 Issigeac
 Lalinde
 Monpazier
 Sainte-Alvère
 Sigoulès
 Vélines
 Villamblard
 Villefranche-de-Lonchat

References

Bergerac